Robert Lynn "Spike" McRoy Jr. (born May 20, 1968) is an American professional golfer who has played on the PGA Tour and the Nationwide Tour.

Early years and education
McRoy was born and raised in Huntsville, Alabama. He got his nickname Spike from his great uncle, a Ty Cobb fan, who sent McRoy a miniature Detroit Tigers uniform when he was born. Cobb was known for his aggressive base running – often "spiking" opposing infielders as he rounded the bases. McRoy graduated from Virgil I. Grissom High School in 1986. He attended the University of Alabama graduating with a bachelor's degree in corporate finance in 1991. He was on the Alabama Crimson Tide golf team while there. He turned professional after graduating.

Professional career
McRoy has split his playing time between the PGA Tour and Buy.com/Nationwide Tour relatively equally throughout his career, and has just over a half-dozen top-10 finishes in each venue. He was the top money winner on the Buy.com Tour in 2000 with $300,638 in earnings, and victories at the Buy.com Dakota Dunes Open and the Buy.com Tour Championship. In 2002, he captured his first win in a PGA Tour event at the B.C. Open. McRoy last played a full PGA Tour season in 2005 and continues to compete occasionally on the PGA Tour and Web.com Tour.

Outside golf
McRoy is married with three children and lives in Huntsville. He was inducted into the Huntsville-Madison County Athletic Hall of Fame in 2009.

Professional wins (7)

PGA Tour wins (1)

Buy.com Tour wins (2)

Other wins (4)
1990 Cajun Classic (as an amateur)
1992 Alabama Open, two wins on the Hooters Tour

Results in major championships

Note: McRoy never played in the Masters Tournament.

CUT = missed the half-way cut
"T" = tied

Results in The Players Championship

CUT = missed the halfway cut
"T" indicates a tie for a place

See also
1996 PGA Tour Qualifying School graduates
1997 PGA Tour Qualifying School graduates
2000 Buy.com Tour graduates

References

See also
Alabama Crimson Tide golf

External links

American male golfers
Alabama Crimson Tide men's golfers
PGA Tour golfers
Korn Ferry Tour graduates
Golfers from Alabama
Sportspeople from Huntsville, Alabama
1968 births
Living people